Miss Namibia 2022 is the 27th edition of Miss Namibia pageant that was held on August 12 2022. At the end of the event, Chelsi Shikongo crowned Cassia Sharpley as her successor. Sharpley will represent Namibia in Miss Universe 2022.

Results
Color key

Contestants 
12 contestants competed for the title:

Judges

Finals
McBright Kavari – Designer
Helena Kandjumbwa – Founder of New Elementary Namibia
Maguire Mulder – Commercial and Trade Marketing manager at Coca-Cola Namibia
Dr. Esperance Luvindao – Medical Doctor
Gerine Hoff – Editor of the Windhoek Express

References

External links
 

Miss Namibia
2022 beauty pageants